John Francis Sartorius Winnington  (17 September 1876 – 22 September 1918) was an English first-class cricketer who played in one match for Worcestershire against Oxford University at The University Parks in 1908. He scored 0 and 20 in Worcestershire's crushing 332-run victory. He was born in Charlton Kings, Cheltenham, Gloucestershire.

Winnington was commissioned into a Militia battalion of the Worcestershire Regiment in 1895. He later transferred to the Regular Army and was promoted captain in 1901. In the First World War, Winnington was promoted lieutenant-colonel in 1915. As well as being awarded the DSO, he was mentioned in dispatches four times. He died of wounds near Kefar Kassin, Ramle, Palestine at the age of 42 while commanding a battalion of the Northamptonshire Regiment.

References

External links
 

1876 births
1918 deaths
English cricketers
Worcestershire cricketers
British Militia officers
Worcestershire Regiment officers
Northamptonshire Regiment officers
British Army personnel of World War I
British military personnel killed in World War I
Companions of the Distinguished Service Order
Sportspeople from Cheltenham
Military personnel from Gloucestershire